Gelila Zakarias is an island in the northwestern part of Lake Tana in Ethiopia. The island is a circular, forested cone with the monastery church of Iyasus at the peak. When R.E. Cheesman visited it in 1933, he found the monastery flourishing, and the abbot invited him to partake in their Lenten far.

According to the Futuh al-Habasa of Sihab ad-Din Ahmad bin 'Abd al-Qader, during the Ethiopian-Adal War, on 18 May 1545 Imam Ahmad Gragn led a group of followers to attack Gelila Zakarias. The rafts carrying the followers of the Imam were met by soldiers in tankwa, the indigenous boats made of papyrus who failed to stop the attackers rafts. Since all of the defenders were in tankwas, once the Imam and his followers outdistanced them, they landed unopposed on the island and burned down the church of Iyasus.

References 

Amhara Region
Islands of Lake Tana